Kraussina is a genus of brachiopods belonging to the family Kraussinidae.

The species of this genus are found in Southern and Eastern Africa.

Species:

Kraussina cognata 
Kraussina crassicostata 
Kraussina crassiocostata 
Kraussina cuneata 
Kraussina gardineri 
Kraussina laevicostata 
Kraussina lata 
Kraussina mercatori 
Kraussina rotundata 
Kraussina rubra

References

Brachiopod genera